Wątok is a river of Poland, a tributary of the Biała, which it meets in Tarnów.

Rivers of Poland
Rivers of Lesser Poland Voivodeship